Patrick H. Hodgson was a United States lawyer who served as General Counsel of the Navy from April 3, 1945 through October 31, 1945.

General Counsels of the United States Navy
Year of birth missing
Year of death missing